Kagithalapuru or Kakitalupuru is a small village in Manubolu mandal of Nellore district of Andhra Pradesh, India.

History
Abdullah Badshah Sultan was the ruler of Nellore district from 1623 to 1672 A.D

References

Villages in Nellore district